Ivashin (Russian: Ивашин) is a Russian masculine surname; its feminine counterpart is Ivashina, which is also sometimes used for males. The surname may refer to
Andrei Ivashin (born 1999), Russian football player
Marianna Ivashina (born 1975), Ukrainian-Dutch engineer
 Victoria Ivashina, Russian-American economist

Russian-language surnames